"Unbelievable" is an uptempo rock song by American singer-songwriter Bob Dylan, released as a single in September 1990 and as the third track on his 27th studio album Under the Red Sky the same month. It was produced by Don Was, David Was and Dylan (under the pseudonym Jack Frost). Dylan also released a promotional music video for the song in which he appeared along with actresses Molly Ringwald and Sally Kirkland.

The single reached No. 70 in Canada, and No. 21 on the Billboard Mainstream Rock chart.

Reception
Dylan scholar Tony Attwood describes the song as lightweight but effective: "Dylan gives us what is in effect a two chord standard rock song with a third chord briefly added and not that much of a melody. In short a driving rock number. And it works!"

In live performance
Dylan performed the song 29 times between 1992 and 2004 on the Never Ending Tour. The live debut occurred at Lansdowne Stadium in Ottawa, Ontario, Canada on August 22, 1992, and the last performance (to date) took place at the Tabernacle in Atlanta, Georgia on April 12, 2004.

Covers
Bettye LaVette covered it as the opening track of her 2015 album Worthy.

Charts

References

External links
 Unbelievable music video on Bob Dylan's YouTube channel
 Lyrics at Bob Dylan's official site
 Chords at Dylanchords

1990 singles
Songs written by Bob Dylan
Song recordings produced by Bob Dylan
Bob Dylan songs
Columbia Records singles
1990 songs